Greater Poland dialect is a dialect of Polish language used in the Greater Poland. It is used in the area, on the south from the cities of Koło, Kalisz, Ostrów Wielkopolski, Rawicz, and Babimost, from the west from Międzychód and Krzyż Wielkopolski, and along the line of the rivers of Noteć and Warta.

Subgroups 
There are 4 major subgroups of the dialect:
 Central Greater Poland,
 Southern Greater Poland,
 Western Greater Poland,
 Northern Greater Poland.

Citations

References

Bibliography 
Stanisław Dubisz, Halina Karaś, Nijola Kolis: Dialekty i gwary polskie. 1st edition. Warsaw: Wiedza Powszechna, 1995. ISBN 83-2140989-X.
Polish dialects
Greater Poland